Corporate is an American sitcom created by Pat Bishop, Matt Ingebretson, and Jake Weisman. A ten-episode first season premiered on Comedy Central on January 17, 2018. On February 26, 2018, the series was renewed for a second season. Corporates third and final season premiered on July 22, 2020.

Plot
Corporate is set in multinational corporation Hampton DeVille and follows the miserable lives of two downtrodden employees.

Cast

Main
 Matt Ingebretson as Matt Engelbertson
 Jake Weisman as Jake Levinson
 Anne Dudek as Kate Glass
 Adam Lustick as John Strickland
 Aparna Nancherla as Grace Ramaswamy
 Lance Reddick as Christian DeVille

Recurring
 Matt McCarthy as Richard
 Baron Vaughn as Baron
 Anna Akana as Paige
 Ron Lynch as Kevin
 Toni Trucks as Karen
 Sasheer Zamata as Jessica (season 2)

Guest 
 Spencer Macea as Hondo
 Jon Daly as Jeff
 Brent Weinbach as Walter
 Natasha Lyonne as Gretchen
 Fred Willard as Bill Hathaway
 Elizabeth Perkins as The Accountant
 William Fichtner as Brett
 Kyra Sedgwick	as Mrs. Cowboy
 Chris Fleming as Todd
 Kate Walsh as Alyssa Armstrong
 Richard Riehle as Hubert
 Brian George as Zack the Butler
 Melora Walters as Nadine
 Arden Myrin as Courtney
 Norma Michaels as Grandma Dorothy
 Nicole Sullivan as Linda Lee
 Lauren Lapkus as Peggy
 Andy Richter as himself
 Phillip Baker Hall as Arthur
 Aimee Mann as Peg
 Bob Odenkirk as the voice of Black Dog

Episodes

Season 1 (2018)

Season 2 (2019)

Season 3 (2020)

Reception

Critical response
On the review aggregator Rotten Tomatoes, the first season has an approval rating of 87% based on 15 reviews, with an average rating of 8.0/10. The website's critics consensus reads, "Corporate takes a bleak, absurdist look at corporate life to deliver a clever show with a more nihilistic bent than your typical workplace comedy." On Metacritic, which assigns a normalized rating, the series has a score 75 out of 100, based on 7 critics, indicating "generally favorable reviews".

Variety reviewed the series, calling it, “Deliciously dark and hilariously ruthless…a scathing satire of contemporary office culture that feels long, long overdue."

Adweek also lauded the show saying, “It’s the kind of universe building that’s usually reserved for prestige dramas…or big-budget sci-fi feature films.”

Ratings

Season 1

Season 2

Season 3

References

External links
 
 

2018 American television series debuts
2020 American television series endings
2010s American black comedy television series
2010s American satirical television series
2010s American single-camera sitcoms
2010s American workplace comedy television series
2020s American black comedy television series
2020s American satirical television series
2020s American single-camera sitcoms
2020s American workplace comedy television series
Comedy Central original programming
English-language television shows